The Mallaig Extension Railway is a railway line in Highland, Scotland. It runs from Banavie Junction (New) on the Banavie Pier branch of the West Highland Railway to Mallaig. The previous "Banavie Junction" closer to Fort William was renamed "Mallaig Junction" upon opening of the Mallaig Extension Railway. The line is still open as part of the West Highland Line.

Opening 
The railway received Royal Assent on 31 July 1894. The line opened on 1 April 1901. It is famous for the concrete structures built along the line by Sir Robert McAlpine, the most notable of which is Glenfinnan Viaduct.

Connections to other lines 
West Highland Railway at Banavie Junction (new)

Sources 
 
 
 
 Thomas, John (1965). The West Highland Railway. Newton Abbot: David and Charles (Publishers) Ltd. .
 RAILSCOT on Mallaig Extension Railway

North British Railway
Pre-grouping British railway companies
Early Scottish railway companies
Railway companies established in 1894
Railway lines opened in 1901